Brooklyn–South Square Historic District is a national historic district located at Salisbury, Rowan County, North Carolina.  The district encompasses 65 contributing buildings in predominantly residential section of Salisbury.  It largely developed between about 1875 and 1925, and includes notable examples of Federal, Greek Revival, and Late Victorian style architecture. Notable buildings include the Woodson-Overcash House (c. 1840), Blackmer-Propst House (c. 1856), Mowery-Peeler House (c. 1880), Keen-Bastian House (c. 1895), William Trott House (1905), J. W. Glover House (1920s), Cross-Crowell-Rufty Store (1920s), Burges-Lyerly-Fifty/Fifty Store (1920s), and the former St. Peter's Episcopal Church.

It was listed on the National Register of Historic Places in 1985.

References

Historic districts on the National Register of Historic Places in North Carolina
Federal architecture in North Carolina
Greek Revival architecture in North Carolina
Victorian architecture in North Carolina
Buildings and structures in Rowan County, North Carolina
National Register of Historic Places in Rowan County, North Carolina